The 2019 Atlantic 10 men's basketball tournament was the postseason men's basketball tournament for the Atlantic 10 Conference's 2018–19 season. It was held from March 13th through March 17th, 2019 at the Barclays Center in Brooklyn, New York. Saint Louis defeated St. Bonaventure 55–53 in the championship game to win the tournament, and received the A10's automatic bid to the NCAA tournament.

Seeds
All 14 A-10 schools will participate in the tournament. Teams will be seeded by record within the conference, with a tiebreaker system to seed teams with identical conference records. The top 10 teams receive a first-round bye and the top four teams receive a double bye.

Schedule

*Game times in Eastern Time.

Bracket

* denotes overtime period

References

Atlantic 10 men's basketball tournament
2018–19 Atlantic 10 Conference men's basketball season
Basketball competitions in New York City
College sports in New York City
Sports in Brooklyn
Atlantic 10 men's basketball tournament
Atlantic 10 men's basketball tournament
2010s in Brooklyn
Prospect Heights, Brooklyn